Harris Creek is a stream in Ripley County in the U.S. state of Missouri.

Harris Creek has the name of Washington Harris, an early citizen.

See also
List of rivers of Missouri

References

Rivers of Ripley County, Missouri
Rivers of Missouri